Chesma (also transliterated Tchésma) was the second ship of the s built for the Imperial Russian Navy in the 1880s. When the ship was completed she proved to be very overweight which meant that much of her waterline armor belt was submerged. Russian companies could not produce the most advanced armour and machinery desired by the Naval General Staff, so they were imported from the United Kingdom and Belgium. Chesma spent her career as part of the Black Sea Fleet.

When the crew of the battleship  mutinied in June 1905, the ship's crew was considered unreliable and she did not participate in the pursuit of the Potemkin. Chesma did, however, escort Potemkin as  towed her back to Sevastopol from Constanța, Romania, where Potemkin had sought asylum. Chesma was turned over to the Sevastopol port authorities before being stricken on 14 August 1907. Before she was fully dismantled the Naval Ministry decided to use her hull for full-scale armour trials. She was re-designated as Stricken Vessel Nr. 4 on 22 April 1912 before being used as a gunnery target. Afterwards the ship served as a torpedo target for the destroyers of the Black Sea Fleet. During these attacks Chesma settled to the bottom of the Bay of Tendra and was eventually scrapped during the mid-1920s.

Design and description 

Chesma had two 3-cylinder vertical compound steam engines imported from the Belgian Cockerill company. Fourteen cylindrical boilers, also imported from Cockerill, provided steam to the engines.

She differed from her sister ships mainly in her main armament. She had six  Model 1886 35-caliber guns mounted in twin barbette mounts, two forward, side by side, and one aft. Each of the forward mounts could traverse 30° across the bow and 35° abaft the beam, or a total of 155°. The rear mount could traverse 202°. They had a range of elevation from −2° to +15°. Chesmas guns were mounted on unbalanced turntables and they caused her to list when the guns were trained to one side. Traversing all the guns as far as they could go to one side produced a list of 7.6° and made it very difficult for the turntable machinery to rotate the guns back to the fore-and-aft position. This problem had been anticipated and water tanks had been added to counteract the list, but they proved to be virtually useless because they took up to two hours to fill. The problem was partially cured in 1892 when the equipment was rearranged on the turntable to improve their balance, but more thorough solutions to the problem were either deemed too expensive or inadequate. Their rate of fire was reportedly one round every fifteen to seventeen minutes, including training time. Sixty rounds per gun were carried. The main guns were mounted very low, (only ) above the main deck, and caused extensive damage to the deck when fired over the bow or stern. The 'light' shell had a maximum range of  when fired at an elevation of 15°.

The seven  35-caliber guns were mounted on broadside pivot mounts in hull embrasures, except for one gun mounted in the stern in the hull. The eight  five-barreled revolving Hotchkiss guns were mounted in small embrasures in the hull to defend the ship against torpedo boats. Four  five-barreled revolving Hotchkiss guns were mounted in the fighting top. She carried seven above-water  torpedo tubes, one tube forward on each side, able to bear on forward targets, two other tubes were mounted on each broadside forward and aft of the central citadel; the seventh tube was in the stern.

History 

Chesma was named after the Russian victory at the Battle of Chesma in 1770. She was built by the Russian Steam Navigation Company (RoPIT) at Sevastopol. She was laid down in late June 1883, launched on 18 May 1886, and completed on 29 May 1889. She served with the Black Sea Fleet until 1907. She was inactive in 1895, probably for mechanical problems. Chesma conducted trials in 1902 with towing spherical observation balloons and she was re-boilered the following year. Plans were made for a radical reconstruction to be done while her boilers were being replaced. The rebuilding involved cutting her down by one deck and replacing her armament with two twin-gun turrets equipped with 12-inch 40-caliber guns and ten 6-inch 45-caliber guns between the turrets in an armoured citadel that used Krupp armor. This proved to be too expensive and it was cancelled, but not before the armor and turrets had been ordered. Her turrets were used to equip the pre-dreadnought , then under construction.

When the crew of the battleship  mutinied in June 1905, Chesmas crew was considered unreliable, and she did not participate in the pursuit of Potemkin. She escorted Potemkin as  towed her back to Sevastopol from Constanța, Romania, where Potemkin had sought asylum.

The ship was turned over to the Sevastopol port authorities before being stricken on 14 August 1907. Before she was fully dismantled the Naval Ministry decided to use her hull for full-scale armour trials. She was re-designated as Stricken Vessel Nr. 4 on 22 April 1912. Chesma was fitted with a replica of the armour system used in the s to test its effectiveness. She was towed into position and given a 7° list to simulate the descent angle of shells fired at long range. These revealed significant weaknesses in the support structure for the armour plates and in the deck protection, but the Gangut-class ships were too far along in construction to incorporate fixes. Afterwards she served as a torpedo target for the destroyers of the Black Sea Fleet. During these attacks she settled to the bottom of the Bay of Tendra and was eventually scrapped during the mid-1920s.

Notes

Footnotes

Bibliography

External links 

 Photo gallery of the Chesma 
 Specifications of the Chesma

Ekaterina II Class
1886 ships
Battleships of Russia
Ships built at Sevastopol Shipyard